Juan Carlos Calderón López de Arróyabe (7 July 1938 – 25 November 2012) was a Spanish singer-songwriter and musician.

Born in Santander, he was the author of "Eres tú", which, performed by Mocedades, came second in the Eurovision Song Contest 1973. It was an important hit in several countries, including the United States. He wrote another three Eurovision entries: "Tú volverás" by Sergio y Estíbaliz in 1975, "La fiesta terminó" by Paloma San Basilio in 1985, and "Nacida para amar" by Nina in 1989; as well as an entry for the OTI Festival: "Amor de medianoche", which ended up runner-up in 1975 performed by Cecilia. He also wrote music for several movies, including the horror films Vengeance of the Zombies (1973) and Blue Eyes of the Broken Doll (1974). In 1968 he won an Ondas Award. He wrote songs for artists like Luis Miguel (who received a nomination for Song of the Year at Latin Grammy Awards in 2000 with a Calderón song, "O Tú o Ninguna"), Julio Iglesias, Joan Manuel Serrat, Donald Byrd, Stéphane Grappelli, Bill Coleman, Pedro Iturralde, Herb Alpert, Chayanne, Nino Bravo, Camilo Sesto, Paloma San Basilio, Rocío Dúrcal, David Bustamante, Mari Trini, José José, Manuel Mijares, Alejandra Ávalos, María Conchita Alonso and Myriam Hernández, among others

References

External links

1938 births
2012 deaths
Spanish-language singers
Spanish composers
Spanish male composers
Spanish male singer-songwriters
Spanish singer-songwriters
Spanish jazz pianists
Spanish keyboardists
Eurovision Song Contest conductors
Musicians from Cantabria
Singers from Cantabria
20th-century Spanish musicians
Latin music record producers
Spanish record producers
Latin music songwriters
People from Santander, Spain
Male pianists
20th-century conductors (music)
20th-century Spanish male singers
20th-century Spanish singers
Male jazz musicians